Assizes Harbour is a Canadian hamlet in the province of Newfoundland and Labrador.

Located on the Strait of Belle Isle along the Labrador coast, the nearest community is Battle Harbour.

See also
List of communities in Newfoundland and Labrador

Populated coastal places in Canada
Populated places in Labrador